The Kuwait women's national handball team is the national team of Kuwait. It is governed by the Kuwait Handball Association and takes part in international handball competitions.

On 15 September 2015, the International Handball Federation suspended the Kuwait Handball Association.

Asian Championship record

References

External links

IHF profile

National team
Women's national handball teams
Handball